Stow Maries Halt is a  nature reserve south of Stow Maries in Essex. It is owned and managed by the Essex Wildlife Trust.

The former Stow St Mary Halt railway station has marshes, a pond and scrub, together with adjoining pasture which is also part of the reserve. Butterflies include purple and white-letter hairstreaks, and there are flowers such as common fleabane and wild carrot.

There is access from Church Lane.

References

 Essex Wildlife Trust